Café Riche is a café in downtown Cairo, Egypt.

Café Riche may also refer to:
 Café Riche, Paris, a former restaurant in Paris
 Café Riche, Pretoria, a restaurant in Pretoria, South Africa